The Aquarium of Genoa is the largest aquarium in Italy. Located in the Old Harbour area of Genoa, Italy, the  aquarium is a member organization of the European Association of Zoos and Aquaria (EAZA), and welcomes more than 1.2 million visitors each year.

History
The aquarium was originally built for Genoa Expo '92 (International Exhibition Genoa '92 Colombo '92), celebrating 500 years since the Genoese sailor Christopher Columbus discovered the new world. The building, which some say looks like a ship ready to head out to sea, was designed by the Genoese architect Renzo Piano of the Renzo Piano Building Workshop. The interior design and initial exhibits for the opening in 1992 were designed by Peter Chermayeff leading a design team at Cambridge Seven Associates. In 1998 the aquarium was expanded with the addition of a  ship connected by walkway to the original building.

Exhibits
The original exhibition concept was to show the Ligurian Sea, the North Atlantic and Caribbean reefs "from two perspectives, one the New World/Old World encounter of 1492, the other the ecological awareness of 1992 and the present."

The tanks host 12.000 animals of 400 different species including fishes, marine mammals, birds, reptiles, amphibians and invertebrates. Among these are dolphins, sea cows, sharks, seals, rays, boas, jellyfishes and penguins.

Conservation
The Aquarium of Genoa coordinates the AquaRing EU project, and provides scientific expertise and content for AquaRing, including documents, images, academic content, and interactive online courses, via its Online Resource Centre.

Gallery

References

External links

1992 establishments in Italy
Buildings and structures in Genoa
Tourist attractions in Genoa
Genoa, Aquarium of
Renzo Piano buildings
World's fair architecture in Italy